Overkill's The Walking Dead is a first-person shooter developed by Overkill Software and published by Starbreeze Studios and 505 Games. The title, based on the comics of The Walking Dead, has a strong emphasis on cooperative gameplay. The game was released worldwide for Microsoft Windows in November 2018. On 26 February 2019, Skybound Entertainment terminated their contract with Starbreeze Studio, leading to the discontinuation of all efforts on the game, including cancellation of efforts to bring the game to consoles.

Gameplay 
Overkill's The Walking Dead is a first-person shooter with an emphasis on cooperative gameplay. The game features four characters, namely Maya, Aidan, Grant, and Heather. Each has their own unique skills and abilities, and players must work together in order to complete their objectives. Set in Washington D.C., a post-apocalyptic environment which was overran by zombies, the game features stealth, survival horror and role-playing elements.

Plot

In post-apocalypse Washington, D.C., Anderson Banks loses his wife and daughter. Unable to cope, Anderson becomes suicidal, wanting the walkers to find him. He is found by Heather Campbell, a former kindergarten teacher. They form a bond and bring more survivors together, setting up Camp Anderson in Georgetown. The camp survives by scavenging food and supplies from the city and avoiding any dangerous locals and walkers. They are met by a group called "The Family," who makes Camp Anderson an offer: they can take half of the camp's food and supplies. Anderson gives them a counteroffer: they can leave the way they came. After threats are exchanged, the Family leaves, but walkers appear and attack the camp. While the camp is successfully defended and barricades are rebuilt, the group learns that the walkers were a distraction, allowing the Family to raid the storehouse, kill some of the group, and steal the water purifier. Unwilling to accept defeat, Anderson orders Heather to lead a group to the Family's hideout and retrieve the purifier.

In Central Georgetown, Heather goes on a reconnaissance mission with Grant Moore, a seasoned hunter, and they infiltrate an apartment building. Heather kills a walker with her pickax inside an apartment with a good vantage point, while Grant uses his silenced sniper rifle to scout the Family's hideout. He sees walkers at the gates, a lot of the Family inside, and the purifier, which has already been installed. Heather contacts Maya Evans, a former surgeon, via radio. Maya, along with Aidan Hunt, a former architect, infiltrates the hideout on its south side, where they regroup with Heather and Grant. Once inside, Aidan and Maya sneak up on two men and kill them with knives, and Heather kills a third with her scoped crossbow. Maya unhooks the installed purifier while Aidan keeps watch, getting his nailed baseball bat ready. When an armored guard with a riot shield and a revolver notices the dead bodies, spotlights are switched on and Maya is discovered. Heather tosses a smoke grenade at the guard, and Grant shoots the lock at the gates with his rifle, allowing the walkers to enter. With the water purifier retrieved, Maya shoots at the armored guard with her submachine gun, but the guard blocks all shots with the shield. When Aidan attempts to kill him with his bat, he is knocked to the ground. Facing Maya again, he is shot at some more, but Aidan shoots him in the back with a shotgun. Maya helps Aidan up, and the group escapes into the streets with the horde coming after them. Heather fires a flare into the sky for Caleb Bernard, their getaway driver, to find them in his truck.

Camp Anderson is attacked by the Family, attempting to steal supplies. The Family is driven back, but Anderson knows they will not stop coming. Heather suggests they steal a radio from the Family to listen in on their plans and prevent any more surprise attacks. After finding and scouting another outpost in the West End, Heather, Grant, Maya, and Aidan infiltrate it and steal radio parts. With the radio built and working, the information Camp Anderson gains shows suspicious activity at the Family's main base, a former shopping mall in Foggy Bottom. When the group finds a way into the mall and makes their way to the roof, they instead find hostile soldiers from another group, called "The Brigade". Fighting their way through, the group makes their way inside the mall to find and rescue Reina, the leader of the Family.
Back at Camp Anderson, Reina reveals that the Brigade offered the Family to join them or die. When Reina agreed to join, the Brigade ordered the Family to supply them with a portion of their goods, thus being the reason why the Family continued to attack and raid Camp Anderson. The next morning, the Brigade finds and surrounds the camp. Hurst, their lieutenant, tells Anderson to join or die. When Heather shows defiance, Hurst shoots and kills her. This angers Anderson and the rest of the camp, so they fight back, aided by Reina. The Brigade continues their onslaught, killing and wounding members of the camp and planting bombs, so Anderson decides to evacuate via Caleb's truck with some survivors, while others escape with Reina. After regrouping, Reina says she can radio Sarah Bridger, the leader of a camp in Eckington who has no love for the Brigade. Bridger agrees to guide the group via radio through the subway underneath Dupont Circle to make it to Eckington safely.

At the camp, with limited supplies, Maya can only help so many that were wounded during the attack. However, Reina reveals that the Family had retrieved drugs and antibiotics before the Brigade attacked them, but this supply of medicine is still at the shopping mall in Foggy Bottom, which is controlled by the Brigade. With Reina, the group infiltrates the shopping mall once again, fighting through Brigade soldiers and hordes of walkers, eventually finding the medical supplies and escaping safely. Once back at the Eckington camp, the group places defenses in preparation for the Brigade's retaliation. When the Brigade attacks, the camp is successfully defended.

Anderson decides to take the fight to the Brigade. A maintenance tunnel leads close to their camp at the Lincoln Memorial. Once the camp is infiltrated, the group fights their way through to the Memorial, where they discover Heather's body hung upside down in front of one of the pillars. Continuing on, they find Hurst hiding in a panic room. The group enters the panic room and kills Hurst. In the aftermath, the Brigade becomes scattered, and Anderson learns that Hurst was only taking orders from a superior named Patterson. But this does not deter Anderson, and he is prepared to fight any enemy that comes against him and his family.

Development 
Overkill's The Walking Dead is developed by Overkill Software. According to brand director Almir Listo, although the game is a licensed title, Overkill was free to have their own interpretation of the source material and create the game with their own vision. Robert Kirkman, the creator of the comics, was involved in the game's production, providing advice and feedback. Listo added that the game was designed for "adults", and the story will explore "different things emotionally that aren't investigated much by the TV show". Despite being set in the comic series' universe, the game's four playable characters are original. According to Kirkman, the gameplay will be similar to Payday: The Heist. Listo noted that the game's gameplay will be similar to the raids featured in Destiny.

The game was announced on August 14, 2014 by Overkill Software. To celebrate the collaboration, Overkill announced that Lucille, a weapon from The Walking Dead, will be available for players of Payday 2. The game showed up at E3 2015 at a "proof of concept" for the virtual reality headset developed by Starbreeze Studios. In 2016, the game was delayed to ensure that the game would be available in Asian markets during the game's initial launch. It was delayed again in 2017. At E3 2018, the first gameplay footage was released. Starbreeze Studios released the game for Windows in November 2018 while 505 Games was to release the PlayStation 4 and Xbox One versions in February 2019. All future efforts on the game were discontinued on February 26, 2019, and the console versions were cancelled as Skybound Entertainment terminated its contract with Starbreeze Studios due to the game's poor reception. The game was later removed from sales on Steam.

Due to these issues, the game was considered a commercial failure. Starbreeze had been anticipating significant revenue from the game, and spent a year from December 2018 to December 2019 in corporate restructuring to regain a stable financial base to move forward.

Reception

According to review aggregator Metacritic, the game received mixed reviews from both critics and users upon release. The game was a commercial failure for publisher Starbreeze.

Metro praised the smooth, competent gunplay and the well-polished post-apocalyptic world, but disliked the outdated design, severe repetition, infuriating difficulty spikes, and an overall lack of originality. Slant Magazine was even more critical, stating that the game "feels less like its own entry into the existing Walking Dead universe than a reskin of Payday 2" while criticizing the unreasonable load times, the technical issues and the long missions without checkpoints. It concluded the review with writing "Overkill's The Walking Dead certainly stokes the player's despair, but not the sort that its developers intended."

References

External links 
 Official website

2018 video games
505 Games games
Cooperative video games
First-person shooters
Cancelled PlayStation 4 games
Single-player video games
Starbreeze Studios games
Video games set in Washington, D.C.
Video games developed in Sweden
Video games featuring female protagonists
The Walking Dead video games
Windows games
Windows-only games
Cancelled Xbox One games
Unreal Engine games
Video games about zombies